Joseph Yang Yongqiang (born April 11, 1970) is a Chinese Catholic priest and Bishop of the Roman Catholic Diocese of Zhoucun since 2013.

Biography
He was ordained a priest in June 1995.

He accepted the episcopacy with a papal mandate on November 15, 2010. On February 8, 2013 he became bishop of the Roman Catholic Diocese of Zhoucun.

In December 2016 he was elected vice-president of the Catholic Patriotic Association.

References

External links
 Krótka biografia na GCatholic.org

1970 births
Living people
21st-century Roman Catholic bishops in China
Bishops of the Catholic Patriotic Association